Herbert Robinson García (born April 10, 1996) is a Mexican professional footballer who plays for Deportivo CAFESSA Jalisco

Career
Robinson began playing football in Santos Laguna's youth system, and eventually played for the senior side in the Copa MX. His father and grandfather were U.S. citizens, and although not yet a U.S. citizen himself, Robinson participated in a United States men's national under-20 soccer team training camp during 2013.

References

External links
 

1996 births
Living people
Mexican expatriate footballers
Association football midfielders
Santos Laguna footballers
Tampico Madero F.C. footballers
Tlaxcala F.C. players
Deportivo CAFESSA Jalisco footballers
Tacoma Defiance players
Ascenso MX players
Liga Premier de México players
Tercera División de México players
USL Championship players
Mexican expatriate sportspeople in the United States
Expatriate soccer players in the United States
Footballers from Coahuila
Mexican footballers
Sportspeople from Monclova